Fred Weicker (August 1, 1906 – March 7, 1955) was an American athlete. He competed in the men's discus throw at the 1928 Summer Olympics.

References

1906 births
1955 deaths
Athletes (track and field) at the 1928 Summer Olympics
American male discus throwers
Olympic track and field athletes of the United States
Place of birth missing